El Hassi is a town in north-eastern Algeria.

Localities  of the commune 

The commune of El Hassi  is composed of 11 localities:

References

Communes of Batna Province
Batna Province